Alhinho is a Portuguese surname. Notable people with the surname include:

Alexandre Alhinho (born 1953), Cape Verdean footballer and manager
Carlos Alhinho (1949–2008), Portuguese footballer and manager
Valdo Alhinho (born 1988), Angolan footballer

Portuguese-language surnames